The Social Democrats is a Croatian centre-left political party founded in 2022. The party was preceded by a parliamentary group of the same name that broke away from the Social Democratic Party of Croatia in October 2021.

History 
The party was officially launched on July 9, 2022, and at the time of foundation was the largest opposition force in the Sabor. The party stated they will not go against the initiatives of Croatian Democratic Union that benefit the citizens, and that they do not have plans to be obstructive.

References

2022 establishments in Croatia
Political parties established in 2022
Pro-European political parties in Croatia
Progressive parties
Social democratic parties in Croatia